Kristine Musademba (born December 3, 1992) is an American former competitive figure skater. She won three gold medals on the ISU Junior Grand Prix series and qualified twice for the JGP Final. She is the 2008 U.S. junior national pewter medalist.

Personal life 
Kristine Musademba's mother is from the Philippines and her father is from Zimbabwe. She attended Columbia College of Columbia University and was in the class of 2015.

Career 
Musademba started skating at the age of 7, after accompanying her best friend to the rink. She won the novice silver medal at the 2007 U.S. Championships.

The following season, Musademba received her first ISU Junior Grand Prix assignments, winning silver in Austria and placing fourth in England. Her results qualified her to the JGP Final, where she finished 4th. She then placed fourth on the junior level at the 2008 U.S. Championships.

In the 2008–09 season, Musademba won gold at both of her JGP assignments, France and Spain. She qualified for her second JGP Final and came in 6th. She competed on the senior level at the 2009 U.S. Championships, finishing 11th.

In 2009–10, Musademba won gold in her JGP event in the United States but finished 10th in Croatia. She withdrew from the 2010 U.S. Championships.

Musademba received one senior Grand Prix assignment, the 2010 Cup of China, placing 8th.

Programs

Competitive highlights
GP: Grand Prix; JGP: Junior Grand Prix

References

External links

 
 

American female single skaters
1992 births
Living people
People from Washington, D.C.
American sportspeople of Filipino descent
American people of Zimbabwean descent
Columbia College (New York) alumni
21st-century American women